Từ Dụ or Từ Dũ (20 June 1810 – 22 May 1901), born Phạm Thị Hằng, was a Vietnamese empress, the wife of Thiệu Trị and mother of Tự Đức.

Life
She was granted the title Empress Dowager Từ Dụ after Tự Đức ascended the throne.

Tự Đức died in 1883. Three regents, Nguyễn Văn Tường, Tôn Thất Thuyết and Trần Tiễn Thành, declared Dục Đức, the eldest adoptive-son of Tự Đức, as the new emperor. Three days later, they deposed Dục Đức and enthroned Hiệp Hòa. Từ Dụ was elevated to the position of one of the "Tam Cung" (三宮) together with Trang Ý and Học phi. Từ Dụ played a significant role in the dethronement of Hiệp Hòa, whom was a pro-French emperor, and enthroned Kiến Phúc.

In 1885, she was granted the title Grand Empress Dowager Từ Dụ. Tôn Thất Thuyết decided to launch the Cần Vương movement against French colonists. "Tam Cung" fled to Tomb of Tự Đức together with Emperor Hàm Nghi. Thuyết decided to take them to a mountain base at Tân Sở, and then went to China to hide and seek reinforcements. "Tam Cung" refused, and came back to Huế.

She was granted the title Great Grand Empress Dowager Từ Dụ by Thành Thái in 1889. She died in 1901, and was given the posthumous name Empress Nghi Thiên.

Legacy
A hospital in Ho Chi Minh City was named after her.

References

1810 births
1901 deaths
People from Tiền Giang province
Nguyễn dynasty empresses dowager
19th-century Vietnamese women
20th-century Vietnamese women